Parsix GNU/Linux was a live-CD Linux distribution based on Debian. The Parsix project's goal was to provide a ready-to-use, easy-to-install, desktop and laptop-optimized operating system based on Debian's testing branch and the latest stable release of GNOME. It was possible to install extra software packages from the project's own APT repositories.

In 2017, the official website announced the shutdown of the project, and suggested users switch to Debian Stretch.

Logo
The Parsix logo is inspired by stone flower carvings found in Persepolis.

Usage
Parsix Linux was designed to be used as a Live CD, Live USB, or installed operating system on a hard disk drive. Live mode is useful for operations such as data recovery or hard drive partitioning.

Versions

History
The first version of Parsix GNU/Linux was announced in February 2005 by Alan Baghumian. Seeking a more stable platform, the project started using Debian testing branch as of version 0.85. Starting with version 0.90, Parsix uses characters from the movie Happy Feet to name their releases. The project's own APT repositories were launched in February 2008. The multimedia repository, Wonderland, was launched in September 2010. The Parsix project started to offer security updates for their stable and testing branches as of December 2010.

Receptions 
DistroWatch Weekly reviewed Parsix 1.5r1 in 2008:

LinuxBSDos wrote the review of Parsix 3.0r2:

References

External links

 
 Community User Forums
 Issue Tracker
 Wiki
 Mailing Lists
 

Debian-based distributions
Live USB
LiveDistro
X86-64 Linux distributions
Discontinued Linux distributions
Linux distributions